was a town located in Kaho District, Fukuoka Prefecture, Japan.

As of 2003, the town had an estimated population of 10,980 and a density of 427.40 persons per km2. The total area was 25.69 km2.

On March 26, 2006, Shōnai, along with the towns of Chikuho, Honami and Kaita (all from Kaho District), was merged into the expanded city of Iizuka.

External links
 Iizuka official website 

Dissolved municipalities of Fukuoka Prefecture
Populated places disestablished in 2006
2006 disestablishments in Japan